Pervomaysky is a rural locality (a settlement) in Novochigolskoye Rural Settlement, Talovsky District, Voronezh Oblast, Russia. The population was 51 as of 2010.

Geography 
It is located on the Chigla River, 15 km west of Talovaya.

References 

Rural localities in Talovsky District